The Temnocephalida are an order of turbellarian flatworms.

Unlike most other turbellarians, all the species in this order are either commensal or parasitic. They can be found living on crustaceans, molluscs, and, in some species, even turtles. The commensal species typically live in the gill or mantle cavities of their hosts, while the parasites live inside the digestive system. Anatomically, temnocephalidans can be distinguished from related groups by the presence of an adhesive disc on the underside for attachment to the host, and of a number of finger-like projections arising from the head.

References

External links 

Turbellaria